The Gridley–Howe–Faden–Atkins Farmstead, also known as Brookside Farm, in Kimball County, Nebraska near Kimball, is a historic, well preserved farmstead.  It has buildings and structures dating from 1899 when Henry H. Howe built a  one-story limestone house until 1947 when the last structure on the property was built.  The property claim had been proven by James Gridley in 1891, at which time the property was irrigated, but Gridley moved on to Utah, and Howe obtained the farm.

It was listed on the National Register of Historic Places in 1997.
It was deemed significant as "a rare, well preserved collection of buildings and structures which reflect changes in agriculture from timber claim to 20th century technology and small scale farm diversification."

References

External links 
More photos of the Brookside Farm at Wikimedia Commons

Farms on the National Register of Historic Places in Nebraska
Buildings and structures completed in 1899
Buildings and structures in Kimball County, Nebraska
National Register of Historic Places in Kimball County, Nebraska